Dyschirius hipponensis is a species of ground beetle in the subfamily Scaritinae. It was described by Pic in 1894.

References

hipponensis
Beetles described in 1894